Bernd Wiesner is a skydiver, who competed for the SC Dynamo Hoppegarten / Sportvereinigung (SV) Dynamo. He won several medals at the World Championships.

References 

East German skydivers
Living people
Year of birth missing (living people)